Priest (pseudonym) (born 13 June 1988) is a Chinese author whose works are published online. She has been actively writing since 2007 and has received several awards for her writing. She is signed by the web-based publisher Jinjiang Literature City. She is considered to be among the top five Chinese writers catering to women's interests. She is known for writing various genres of danmei, as well as novels featuring female protagonists. Her works have been adapted into manhua, donghua, and Chinese dramas. Many of her novels have been translated into Korean, Thai, Vietnamese, Traditional Chinese, and Japanese versions. The dramas Guardian, Legend of Fei, Word of Honor, and Justice in the Dark are  based on Priest's novels.

Life 
Priest graduated from Shanghai Jiao Tong University. She then attended Hong Kong University of Science and Technology. She works full-time, writing on the side. She has a cat named Pizai (皮仔).

Writing 
Priest's works have deep humanistic themes, reflecting reality and women's growth. The Biennial Network Literature Award stated: “This work [You Fei] gives full play to the author's ability to control the grand historical theme, vertically continues the classic context of the wuxia novel genre, horizontally connects with the female Internet text, and opens up new possibilities in the old type tradition. The novel has a grand structure, steady rhythm, concise language, delicate and touching characters, and delicate emotions. It is a rare masterpiece of contemporary network wuxia novels." Her novel You Fei was also praised by Sixth Tone for being a unique martial arts piece that focuses on a woman in a genre that is usually male-centered.

Tan Tian of Literature and Art Newspaper says that Priest's Mo Du demonstrates an: "…inheritance of traditional literary resources, which is mainly manifested in three aspects: titles, selected sentences, and contents are integrated into the elements of traditional literary resources; realistic style is concerned about social hot issues; the slow introduction of narrative rhythm and complex story structure suggest that network literature extradite the essence of traditional literature."

About Priest's Can Ci Pin, the 30th China Science Fiction Galaxy Awards stated, "Under the surface of all kinds of sci-fi elements such as mechs, cyber, and interstellar wars, there lies a story about the warmth of humanity. The author uses a first-class narrative ability, bringing sci-fi to a much wider audience."

Xia Lie, vice president of the Chinese Writers Association's Institute of Online Literature, described Priest as a talented writer covering a broad range of genres, from romance and martial arts to science fiction and danmei, with her quality and creativity sets Priest apart from other writers.

Publications

Mainland publications

Foreign publications (translations)

Japan 

 Guardian (镇魂), online serialization, volume 1, June 2021–August 2022
 The Defectives (残次品), online serialization, February 2023

Korea 

 묵독 (默读)
 진혼 (镇魂)
 유비 (有匪)
 살파랑 (杀破狼), online serialization, January 2020 
 열화요수 (烈火浇愁), online serialization, September 2021
 잔차품 (残次品), online serialization, August 2021

Russia 

 Убить волка (杀破狼)

USA/Canada 

 Stars of Chaos (杀破狼), volume 1, July 2023
 Guardian (镇魂), volume 1, May 2023

Taiwan 

 殺破狼(杀破狼)
 獸叢之刀(兽丛之刀)
 鎮魂 (镇魂) 
 最後的守衛 (最后的守卫)
 天涯客
 脫軌(脱轨)
 有匪

Thailand 

 ฆ่าหมาป่า (杀破狼)
 นักรบพเนจรสุดขอบฟ้า (天涯客)
 Guardian (镇魂)
 หลิวเหยา (六爻)

Vietnam 

 Sát Phá Lang (杀破狼)
 Đại Ca (大哥)
 Đọc Thầm (默读)
 Thất Gia (七爷)
 Trấn Hồn (镇魂)
 Tàn Thứ Phẩm (残次品)

Short Stories 

 "Ci Sha/刺杀/Assassinate" (2015) in Machine Fantasy - A Dream of Steampunk (机械幻想- 蒸汽朋克之梦)
 "Hei Se Fang Zhou/黑色方舟/Black Ark" (2013) in The Locked Room (上锁的房间)

Online Short Stories 

 "Gou/狗/Dog" (2014)
 "Yi Qian Nian Yi Hou/一千年以后/A Thousand Years Later" (2009)
 "月光灿烂丑小鸭" (2009)
 "Meng Ji/梦祭/Dream Sacrifice" (2008)

Online Essay 

 "21岁/21 Years Old" (2010)

Awards and honors

Online Literature Awards / Recognitions 

 One of the five classic writers selected for 20 Years of Chinese Network Literature
 4th Orange Melon Network Literature Award
 2020 Orange Melon Network Literature: Top Ten Wuxia Authors in the Past 20 Years
 2020 Orange Melon Network Literature: Top 100 Great God Authors in 20 Years of Network Literature
 2020 Orange Melon Network Literature: Top 100 Industry Representatives of Network Literature in the Past 20 Years

You Fei 

 2nd Network Literature Biennial Award – Bronze Award
 2016 Novel Reading List – Novel of the Year award, Best Ancient Saying of the Year, Best Plot of the Year, Author of the Year
 2017 Weibo Reading – Top Ten Asian books
 2017 Novel Reading List – Most Anticipated Screen Adaptation, Most Popular Ancient Chinese Work
 2016 Douban Annual Reading List – Top 1 Fantasy Genre
 2017 Douban Annual Reading List – Top 1 Fantasy Genre
 2016-2017 Network Committee of China Literary Critics Association, Guangming Literary Criticism Editorial Office, China Youth Publishing House – Top 10 of Recommended Chinese Online Novels List
 Online Literature Masterpiece with the Most Copyright Value in 2020 (Historical Genre)

Zhen Hun 

 China's IP Industry Report 2016 – China's Super IP-Top 100 Influence List

Mo Du 

 2018 Douban Annual Reading List – Top 1 Suspense/Mystery Genre
2018 4th Chinese Original Fiction Awards – Most Popular Work

Can Ci Pin 

 2019 30th Chinese Science Fiction Galaxy Awards – Best Original Book (published by Jiangsu Phoenix Literature and Art Publishing House)
 2019 Top Ten Best Searchlight Chinese Literature Books of 2019

Network Literature Authors List 

 No.5 in the Top 50 Influence Ranking of Chinese Women Writers of Network Literature in 2020
 No.8 in the Top 50 Influence Ranking of Chinese Women Writers of Network Literature in 2019
 No.11 in the Top 50 Influence Ranking of Chinese Women Writers of Network Literature in 2018
 No. 23 in the Top 50 Influence Ranking of Chinese Women Writers of Network Literature in 2017
 No.5 in the 5th Network Literature Authors List of Influential Dangdang Authors

Jinjiang Literature City Awards/Recognitions 

 2010 – Qi Ye won outstanding BL (Boys Love) works
2011 – Tian Ya Ke won outstanding BL (Boys Love) works
 2012 – Zhen Hun won outstanding BL (Boys Love) works
 2013 – Da Ying Xiong Shi Dai won outstanding modern romance
 2013 – Da Ge won outstanding BL (Boys Love) works
 2014 – Shan He Biao Li won outstanding BL (Boys Love) works
 2015 – Sha Po Lang won outstanding BL (Boys Love) works
 2016 – Most Valuable Author of IP adaptation
 2016 – You Fei won excellent historical romance works
 2016 – Mo Du won outstanding BL (Boys Love) works
 2017 – Most Valuable Author of IP adaptation
 2017 – Most Popular Author
 2017 – Can Ci Pin won the Year's Danmei Masterpiece
 2018 – Most Influential Author of IP adaptation
 2018 – Most Popular Author
 2018 – Wu Wu Ran, Wu Gong Hai was a top ten work of modern romance for the year
 2019 – Most Influential Author of IP adaptation
 2019 – Most Popular Author
 2019 – Lie Huo Jiao Chou won the Year's Danmei Masterpiece

Richest Chinese Authors (based on royalties) 

 2019 List of Richest Chinese Authors – 17th

References

Living people
Chinese novelists
Place of birth missing (living people)
1988 births
Pseudonymous women writers
21st-century Chinese women writers
Chinese romantic fiction writers
Chinese science fiction writers
Wuxia writers
Writers on LGBT topics
Chinese historical novelists
Women mystery writers
21st-century pseudonymous writers